The Stone Key is a 2008 science fiction novel by Isobelle Carmody, set in a post apocalyptic world. It is the fifth book in the Obernewtyn Chronicles.

Background

The Stone Key was first published in Australia on 4 February 2008 by Viking Children's Books in trade paperback format. In the United States it has been separated into two books, entitled Wavesong and The Stone Key respectively. The Stone Key was a short-list nominee for the 2008 Aurealis Award for best young-adult novel but lost to Finnikin of the Rock by Melina Marchetta.

Synopsis
When Elspeth sets out from Obernewtyn to Sutrium to testify at the trial of a rebel traitor, she quickly learns not everyone has welcomed the changes caused by the rebellion. Pitted against an invasion, Elsepth finds herself on her strangest and most dangerous journey yet. Drawn into the heart of the Herder Faction, she learns of the terrible plot to destroy the west coast. To stop it, Elspeth risks everything, for if she dies, she will never be able to complete her quest to destroy the weaponmachines which wiped out the Beforetime; but if she succeeds, it might just bring her to the final clue needed to find them...

Reception

A reviewer for the Canberra Times feels that the message of The Stone Key is that "freedom... is messy".

Awards and nominations
In 2008, The Stone Key was shortlisted for "Young Adult Novel" in the Aurealis Awards.

Publication history

Single Book Publications:

Split Books:

References

External links

2008 Australian novels
Science fantasy novels
2008 science fiction novels
Australian fantasy novels
Australian science fiction novels
Australian young adult novels
Young adult fantasy novels
Children's science fiction novels
Obernewtyn Chronicles